Tauriana or Taureana (Taurianum in Latin, Ταυρανία in Greek) is an ancient city of the Bruttii which was located in the southern part of Calabria, in present Taurianova, Reggio Calabria province.

History 
Its ruins were located in the territory of Palmi. The city's name derives from the Italic peoples who founded it, the Tauriani.

The city, which stood on the south bank of the river Metauros (probably Petrace), marked the border of the territory of Reggio Calabria on the Tyrrhenian coast north-west, which began more than that of Locri. Later Roman and later Byzantine Tauriana was destroyed by the Saracens in the middle of the 10th century.

A frazione of the town of Palmi currently bears the name of Taureana.

Ecclesiastical history 
From circa 600 (others say the 3rd or 4th century) Taurianum was also the see of a Catholic diocese, in the ecclesiastical province of Reggio Calabria. In its territory was born and lived in Saint Fantino the Elder alias the Wonderworker, the oldest saint of Calabria (not be confused with St. Fantinus the Younger). The crypt where his remains were buried, below the 'Temple' of Santo Fantino, is the oldest Catholic place of worship in the region.

In 1040 it lost territory to establish the Diocese of Oppido Mamertina.

In 1093 it was suppressed, its territory being merged into the Diocese of Mileto.

Titular see 
In 1968 the diocese was nominally restored as Latin Titular bishopric of Taurianum (Italian Tauriano), of the lowest (Episcopal) rank.

It has had the following incumbent :
 Alessandro Staccioli, O.M.I. (1968.09.26 – ...), Apostolic Vicar of Luang Prabang (Laos) (26 September 1968 - resigned 29 November 1975), later Auxiliary Bishop of Siena–Colle di Val d’Elsa–Montalcino (Tuscany, central Italy) (1975.11.29 – retired 1990.12.10)

External links and sources 
 GCatholic

Palmi
Destroyed cities
Calabria
Pre-Roman cities in Italy
Archaeological sites in Calabria
Populated coastal places in Italy
Former populated places in Italy
Roman sites of Calabria
Populated places established in the 1st millennium BC
Titular sees in Europe